Thomas J. McCall (January 27, 1935 – December 24, 1981) was a former Democratic member of the Pennsylvania House of Representatives.

References

1981 deaths
Democratic Party members of the Pennsylvania House of Representatives
1935 births
20th-century American politicians